A leadership election was held by the United Malays National Organisation (UMNO) party on 19 October 2013. It was won by incumbent Prime Minister and President of UMNO, Najib Razak.

Supreme Council election results
Source

Permanent Chairman

Deputy Permanent Chairman

President

Deputy President

Vice Presidents

Supreme Council Members

See also
Next Malaysian general election
Second Najib cabinet

References

2013 elections in Malaysia
United Malays National Organisation leadership election
United Malays National Organisation leadership elections